Borodinia is a genus of flowering plants belonging to the family Brassicaceae.

Its native range is Southern Siberia to Northern China, Eastern Canada to Central and Eastern USA.

Species:

Borodinia burkii 
Borodinia canadensis 
Borodinia dentata 
Borodinia laevigata 
Borodinia macrophylla 
Borodinia missouriensis 
Borodinia perstellata 
Borodinia serotina

References

Brassicaceae
Brassicaceae genera